North West Sydney Spirit Football Club, an association football club based in North Sydney, Sydney, was founded in 1998 as Northern Spirit before transforming into the Gladesville Hornsby Football Association in 2004. All players who have played in at least one match prior to 2004 are listed below.

Paul Henderson holds the record for the greatest number of appearances for North West Sydney Spirit. Between 1998 and 2004 the Australian goalkeeper played 133 times for the club. The club's goalscoring record is held by Ben Burgess, who scored 16 goals between 2000 and 2001.

Key
 The list is ordered first by date of debut, and then if necessary in alphabetical order.
 Appearances as a substitute are included.
 Statistics are correct up to all matches prior to 2004. Where a player left the club permanently after this date, his statistics are updated to his date of leaving.

Players

References
General
 
 
 

Specific

Northern Spirit FC players
North West Sydney Spirit
Association football player non-biographical articles